The Insper Institute of Education and Research (also known only as Insper) is a private university located in the Vila Olympia district close to the new business centre of São Paulo, Brazil. The university offers higher education courses on fields of Business Administration, Economics, Engineering, Law and Computer Science.

History 

Insper was founded in São Paulo in 1987 as a branch of Ibmec (Brazilian Institute of Capital Markets, See Ibmec São Paulo), another Brazilian business school, which was itself initially founded in Rio de Janeiro in the mid-1980s.

At its foundation, Insper's flagship program was its MBA degree in finance. Over time, the Institute grew, offering an Executive MBA, launched in 1998, and a Master of Laws (LLM) degree, with a business concentration, launched in 1999. In 2002, Insper welcomed its first undergraduate full-time courses, on Business and Economics, with an analytic course syllabus.

In autumn of 2003, the ex-partners of Banco Garantia: Claudio Haddad, Jorge Paulo Lemann, Marcel Herrmann Telles, and Carlos Alberto Sicupira, become the controller shareholders of the institution through acquisitions of other partners shares.

Through 2004, the old filial located on Paraíso was donated to the Instituto Veris a non-profit organization. After that, the institution rebrands itself and was renamed Insper. The names substitution comes to distinguish from Ibmec organizations based on Rio de Janeiro, Belo Horizonte, Brasília, and the recently restored São Paulo unit.

The following year (2005), the institution started the process of campus exchange to Rua Quatá, 300, in the Vila Olímpia neighborhood.

During 2010, Insper receive AACSB International (The Association to Advance Collegiate Schools of Business) certification, the entity responsible for certification of Business Schools over the globe.

Over the year of 2014, the Brazilian Ministry of Education, approved the Insper courses of Mechanic Engineering, Mechatronic Engineering, and Computer Engineering. And in 2015 it began offering a Ph.D. program in Business and Economics. In 2021, Insper launched its first undergraduate law class.

Accreditation 

Insper is accredited by AACSB.

Insper Executive MBA programs (executive, in healthcare management, and in finance) are accredited by the London-based Association of MBAs (AMBA).

References

Business schools in Brazil
Universities and colleges in São Paulo
Private universities and colleges in Brazil